Lafayette County High School may refer to:
 Lafayette County High School (Arkansas)
 Lafayette County High School (Florida)